Tanner Price is a former American football quarterback. He played college football at Wake Forest. He also attended Westlake High School in Texas.

High school career
Price attended Westlake High School in Austin, Texas. He helped Westlake to the state 5A state championship game as a senior. In the championship game, he threw for 250 yards and rushed for 92 yards on 20 carries. His Senior year he was also named second team All-Centex and was District 25-5A offensive MVP. As a junior, he threw for 2,302 yards and 15 touchdowns and was rated as the No. 35 quarterback prospect in the country by Rivals.com his senior year.

|}

College career
Price committed to Wake Forest on June 23, 2009. As a freshman, he battled returning junior Skylar Jones (who eventually transferred to Memphis) and sophomore Ted Stachitas. Ted Stachitas started the first 2 games but after that, Price started 9 while Stachitas started 1. He set a Wake Forest freshman passing records in yards, percentage, passes attempted, passes completed, starts and touchdowns. He ended up passing for 1,349 yards and completed 59% of his passes for 7 touchdowns. His sophomore season he made 13 starts while leading his team to a bowl game and passed for 3,019 yards while completing 60% of his passes for 20 touchdowns. His junior season the team started running more with running back Joshua Harris and he was banged up all year and passed for 2,300 yards and threw 12 touchdowns and completed 56% of his passes. His senior year, he was banged up again and passed for 2,078 yards in 11 starts and had 13 touchdowns while completing 55% of his passes. He also had 2014 NFL draft pick Michael Campanaro all 4 years and he was his leading receiver for 3 of them. He finished his career as the number 2 career passer in Wake Forest History passing for 8899 yards in his career.

Career statistics

Statistics

Professional career
Price attended the Montreal Alouettes training camp but did not make the team and was not drafted in the 2014 NFL Draft and has not been selected as a free agent by an NFL team yet. He is currently playing (2015 season) in France for Les Cougars de St-Ouen l'Aumone. Price was named player of the week for the French League in week 2 after throwing for 327 yards and 3 touchdowns.

After an undefeated season with the Cougars he won the 2015 French "Elite" championship, throwing for 1 touchdown and rushing for 1, helping the team to a 28-7 victory.

References

External links
https://sports.yahoo.com/tulsa/football/recruiting/player-Tanner-Price-87855
http://espn.go.com/college-football/player/stats/_/id/500554/tanner-price
http://www.wakeforestsports.com/sports/m-footbl/mtt/tanner_price_585485.html

1991 births
Living people
American football quarterbacks
Wake Forest Demon Deacons football players